Sean Patrick Maloney (born May 25, 1971) is a former Major League Baseball right-handed pitcher for the Los Angeles Dodgers and Milwaukee Brewers from 1997-1998.

External links

1971 births
Living people
Los Angeles Dodgers players
Major League Baseball pitchers
Milwaukee Brewers players
Baseball players from Rhode Island
Georgetown University alumni
Georgetown Hoyas baseball players
People from South Kingstown, Rhode Island
Helena Brewers players
Beloit Brewers players
El Paso Diablos players
Tucson Toros players
Albuquerque Dukes players
Gulf Coast Orioles players
Bowie Baysox players
Frederick Keys players
Rochester Red Wings players